Adaku Utah  (born 1984) is a Nigerian sixth-generation Igbo traditional healer, speaker, writer and artist whose work focuses on gender, reproductive, race, youth and healing justice Civil rights movements for social change. She is the cofounder of Harriet's Apothecary, an alternative healing community, and a 2015 Create Change Fellow.

Life 
Adaku Utah was born in 1991 in Lagos with father from Abia State, and mother from Imo State, both from southeastern Nigeria. Utah is descendant of herbalists, and farmers who dealt in herbal treatments and ancient care, she was chronically ill as a child growing up and had to be treated with herbal medicine to better outcomes over orthodox medicines. Utah received a BSc in Biotechnology and Psychology from Pennsylvania State University.

As an activist, she has worked with organizations including the Illinois Caucus for Adolescent Health, Black Lives Matter, Black LGBTQI+ Migrant Project, The Movement for Black Lives, Yale University, Planned Parenthood, Astraea Lesbian Foundation for Justice, Black Women's Blueprint, and the Audre Lorde Project. As a performance artist, she had worked with Decadancetheatre and founded Soular bliss. Utah, who refers to herself as a queer, lives in Brooklyn, New York.

Recognition 

 2012: Sexuality Leadership Development Fellowship of the Africa Regional Sexuality Resource Centre.
 2012: Center for Whole Communities Whole Thinking Fellowship Award.
 2012: Featured Nominee for Girl Tank and MTV Voices 10,000 Names in 100 Days.
 Chicago Foundation for Women's Jessica Eve Patt Award.

References 

1984 births
21st-century LGBT people
American people of Igbo descent
Nigerian LGBT people
Living people